Sai Baba of Shirdi (c. 1838? – 15 October 1918), also known as Shirdi Sai Baba, was an Indian yogi, spiritual master and fakir, considered to be a saint, revered by both Hindu and Muslim devotees during and after his lifetime.

According to accounts from his life, Sai Baba preached the importance of "realization of the self" and criticized "love towards perishable things". His teachings concentrate on a moral code of love, forgiveness, helping others, charity, contentment, inner peace, and devotion to God and Guru. He stressed the importance of surrender to the true Satguru, who, having trodden the path to divine consciousness, can lead the disciple through the jungle of spiritual growth.

Sai Baba condemned discrimination based on religion or caste. Whether he was a Muslim or a Hindu remains unclear, but the distinction was of no consequence to the man himself. His teachings combined elements of Hinduism and Islam: he gave the Hindu name Dwarakamayi to the mosque in which he lived, practised both Hindu and Muslim rituals, and taught using words and figures that drew from both traditions.

Among his favourite sayings to devotees were "Look to me, and I shall look to you" and "Allah tera bhala karega" (translation: God will bless you).
He is thought by devotees to be an avatar of the Hindu god Dattatreya.

Biography 

Most information about Shirdi Sai Baba tends to be derived from a book called Shri Sai Satcharitra written by a disciple called Hemadpant (also known as Annasaheb Dabholkar / Govind Raghunath) in 1922 in Marathi. The book is a compilation based on accounts of various disciples and Hemadpant's personal observations from 1910 onwards. Another devotee, Sri Narasimha Swamy, wrote a book Life of Sai Baba.

Early years 

Although Shirdi Sai Baba's place and date of birth are unknown, there are some indications that he was born not far from Shirdi, in a town now in the west Indian state of Maharashtra.  According to some sources, he was born in the small village of Pathri in Maharashtra, to a boatman called Ganga Bhavadia and his wife Devagiriamma.  Sai Baba is also claimed to have been born in Tamil Nadu. According to this version, his mother’s name was Vaishnavdevi and his father’s name was Abdul Sattar. 

Baba was notorious for giving vague, misleading and contradictory replies to questions concerning his parentage and origins, brusquely stating the information was unimportant. He reportedly told a close follower, Mahalsapati, that he was born to Deshastha Brahmin parents in the village of Pathri and had been entrusted to the care of a Muslim fakir in his infancy. According to multiple sources, he was brought up by a Fakir in early childhood. On another occasion, Baba reportedly said that the fakir's wife had left him in the care of a Hindu guru, Venkusa of Selu, and that he had stayed with Venkusa for 12 years as his disciple.

Baba reportedly arrived at the village of Shirdi in the Ahmednagar District of Maharashtra, India, when he was about sixteen years old. Although there is no agreement among biographers about the date of this event, it is generally accepted that Baba stayed in Shirdi for three years, disappeared for a year, and then returned permanently around 1858, just after the Indian Rebellion of 1857. This suggests a possible birth year of 1838. He led an ascetic life, sitting motionless under a neem tree and meditating while sitting in an asana. The Sai Satcharita recounts the reaction of the villagers.

The people of the village were wonder-struck to see such a young lad practicing hard penance, not minding heat or cold. By day he associated with no one, by night he was afraid of nobody.

Some of the religiously-inclined villagers (Mahalsapati, Appa Jogle and Kashinatha) visited him regularly.   The village children considered him mad and threw stones at him. After some time he left the village and it is unknown where he went or what happened to him. There are some indications that he met with many saints and fakirs and worked as a weaver. He is reported to have said that he fought with the army of Rani Lakshmibai of Jhansi during the Indian Rebellion of 1857.

Name 
Sai Baba's real name remains unknown. The name Sai was given to him by the temple priest Mahalsapati when he returned to Shirdi in 1858. The word Sai refers to a religious mendicant but can also mean God. In several Indian and Middle Eastern languages the term Baba is an honorific signifying grandfather, father, old man or sir. Thus Sai Baba denotes "holy father", "saintly father" or (venerable) poor old man.

Return to Shirdi

Around this time Sai Baba adopted the practice of dressing in a knee-length one-piece Kafni robe and a cloth cap.  Ramgir Bua, a devotee, testified that Sai Baba was dressed like an athlete and sported 'long hair flowing down to the end of his spine' when he arrived in Shirdi, and that he never had his head shaved. It was only after Baba forfeited a wrestling match with one Mohiddin Tamboli that he took up the kafni and cloth cap, articles of typical Sufi clothing. This attire contributed to Baba's identification as a Muslim fakir and was one reason for the initial hostility toward him in a predominantly Hindu village.

For four to five years, Baba lived under a neem tree, and undertook long periods of meditation. His manner was said to be withdrawn and uncommunicative, and he often wandered for long periods in the jungle around Shirdi. He was eventually persuaded to take up residence in an old and dilapidated mosque, where he lived a solitary life, surviving by begging for alms and receiving itinerant Hindu or Muslim visitors. In the mosque, he maintained a sacred fire (dhuni), and gave sacred ash ('Udi') from the fire to guests on their departure. The ash was believed to have healing and apotropaic powers. He performed the function of a local hakim and treated the sick by application of ashes. He delivered spiritual teachings to his visitors, and recommended the reading of the Ramayana and Bhagavat Gita for Hindus and the Qur'an for Muslims. He insisted on the indispensability of the unbroken remembrance of God's name (dhikr), and often expressed himself in a cryptic manner with the use of parables, symbols and allegories.

Baba is believed to have tended a garden called Lendi Baug, named after a riverlet called Lendi which flowed nearby. The garden still exists; it contains temples (samadhis) commemorating people and animals associated with Baba's life, and continues to be visited by pilgrims.

Some of Shirdi Sai Baba's disciples became well-known spiritual figures and saints, most notably Mahalsapati, a priest of the Khandoba temple in Shirdi, and Upasani Baba Maharaj, who himself became the teacher of Meher Baba. He was revered by other saints as well, such as Bidkar Maharaj, Gagangiri Maharaj, Janakidas Maharaj and Sati Godavari Mataji. Sai Baba referred to several saints as 'my brothers', especially the disciples of Swami Samartha of Akkalkot.

In 1910, Shirdi Sai Baba's fame began to spread in Mumbai. Being regarded as a saint with the power of performing miracles, and even as an avatar, numerous people came to visit him. They built his first temple at Bhivpuri, Karjat.

Final years and death (Samadhi)

In August 1918, Shirdi Sai Baba told some of his devotees that he would soon be "leaving his mortal body". Towards the end of September, he had high fever and stopped eating. As his condition deteriorated, he asked his disciples to recite holy texts to him, although he also continued to meet visitors. He died on 15 October 1918, the same day as that year's Vijayadashami festival. His remains were interred at Buti Wada in Shirdi, which later became a place of worship that is known today as Shree Samadhi Mandir or Shirdi Sai Baba Temple.

Teachings and practices

Sai Baba opposed all persecution based on religion or caste. He was an opponent of religious orthodoxy – Christian, Hindu and Muslim.

Sai Baba encouraged his devotees to pray, chant God's name, and read holy scriptures. He advised Muslims to study the Qur'an and Hindus to study texts such as the Ramayana, Bhagavad Gita and Yoga Vasistha. He instructed his devotees and followers to lead a moral life, help others, love every living being without any discrimination, and develop two important features of character: faith (Shraddha) and patience (Saburi). He criticised atheism.

In his teachings, Sai Baba emphasised the importance of performing one's duties without attachment to earthly matters and of being content regardless of the situation. In his personal practice, he observed worship procedures belonging to Islam; although he did not engage in regular rituals, he allowed the practice of Salah, chanting of Al-Fatiha, and Qur'an readings at Muslim festival times. Occasionally reciting the Al-Fatiha, Baba enjoyed listening to mawlid and qawwali accompanied by the tabla and sarangi twice daily.

Sai Baba interpreted the religious texts of both Islam and Hinduism. He explained the meaning of the Hindu scriptures in the spirit of Advaita Vedanta, with a strong emphasis on the path of bhakti (devotion). All three of the main Hindu spiritual paths — Bhakti Yoga, Jnana Yoga, and Karma Yoga — influenced his teachings.

Sai Baba encouraged charity and stressed the importance of sharing. He said

Worship and devotees

A local Khandoba priest, Mhalsapati Nagre, is believed to have been Shirdi Sai Baba's first devotee. In the 19th century, Sai Baba's followers were only a small group of inhabitants of Shirdi and a few people from other parts of India.
Today, because of Sai Baba, Shirdi has become a place of importance in India and is counted among the major Hindu places of pilgrimage. The first Sai Baba temple is situated at Kudal, Sindhudurg. This temple was built in 1922. 

The Sai Baba Temple in Shirdi is visited by an average of 25,000 pilgrims a day. During religious festivals, this number can reach up to 100,000. Both the interior of the temple and the exterior cone are covered with gold. Inside the temple, the statue of Sai Baba is carved out of Italian marble and is seen draped with royal cloth, wearing a gold crown and adorned with fresh flower garlands. The temple is managed by the Shri Sai Baba Sansthan Trust.

Following rituals and traditions dating back to when Baba was still alive, four Aartis are held daily (corresponding to the time of the day) inside the Samadhi Mandir.

 Kakad Aarti (The Morning Aarti) at 4:30 (am)
 Madhyan Aarti (The Afternoon Aarti) at 12:00 (pm)
 Dhup Aarti (The Evening Aarti) 6:30 (pm)
 Shej Aarti (The Night Aarti) at 10:30 (pm)

The Palanquin procession of Sai Baba takes place every Thursday from the Samadhi Mandir to Dwarkamayi, onward to Chavdi and back to the Sai Baba Mandir. Devotees belonging to all faiths are welcome to take Darshan in the Samadhi Mandir and have free meals in the Prasadalaya, irrespective of caste, creed, and religion.

Sai Baba of Shirdi is especially revered and worshiped in the states of Maharashtra, Odisha, Andhra Pradesh, Telangana, Karnataka, Tamil Nadu and Gujarat. 

The Shirdi Sai Baba movement began in the 19th century, while he was living in Shirdi. In recent years, the movement has spread to the Netherlands, the Caribbean, Nepal, Canada, United States, Australia, United Arab Emirates, Malaysia, United Kingdom, Germany, France and Singapore.

Hindus and Muslims
In a verse of the midday arti, devotees sing:

Baba often talked about the Hindu gods and quoted from sacred texts. On occasion he would  comment on passages from the Bhagavad Gita, the Isha Upanishad, and others. The names of Krishna and Rama were sacred to him. With Muslim followers, he talked of Allah and the Koran, often quoting Persian verses. He frequently used the expression "Allah rakhega vaiia rahena" ("Let us be content with what we have, and submit our will to Allah"). He told his listeners that he, like them, was but a devotee of Allah, a humble faqir with two arms and two legs. In later years, Parsis and Christians would also visit him in Shirdi. He respected all faiths, and taught that all are particular paths toward one ineffable goal.

His notion of the unity of all mankind was congruous with both Advaitism and Sufism. "God being one and the master of all also meant that all his creatures were part of one big family," writes Sikand. "This belief was entirely in keeping with both the Bhakti philosophy as well as the teachings of the Sufis, who believed that the light of God exists in every creature, indeed in every particle of His creation." For Sai Baba, all paths were equally valid, "Ishwar" (the Hindu God) and "Allah" being synonymous. People coming to his abode were so taken aback to see Hindus, Muslims, and others living together so peacefully that in many instances it changed their entire lives and belief systems.

Followers

Shirdi Sai Baba left behind no spiritual heirs, appointed no disciples, and did not provide formal initiation (diksha), despite requests. Some of Sai Baba's notable disciples include Mahalsapathi, Madhav Rao (Shama), Nanasaheb Peshway, Bayijabai, Tatya Kote Patil, Kakasaheb Dixit, Radhakrishna Maai, Hemadpant, Bhuti, Das Ganu, Lakshmi Bai, Nanavali, Abdul Baba, Sapatanekar, Nanasaheb Chandodkar, B.V. Narashima Swamiji. Some disciples became well-known spiritual figures, such as Upasani Maharaj of Sakori. After the death of Sai Baba, his devotees offered the daily Aarti to Upasani Maharaj when he paid a visit to Shirdi twice within 10 years.

Hindus

The Hindu saint Anandanath of Yewala called Sai Baba a "precious diamond." Another saint, Gangagir, said "Blessed is Shirdi, that it got this precious jewel." Sri Beedkar Maharaj greatly revered Sai Baba and when he met him in 1873, bestowed the title Jagad guru upon him. Sai Baba was also greatly respected by Vasudevananda Saraswati (known as Tembye Swami). He was also revered by a group of Shaivic yogis, known as the Nath-Panchayat. He is considered an avatar of the "Supreme Reality" (Brahman or God), a satguru, or saint, depending on individual proclivities. This is not uncommon in Hinduism where there is no central doctrine or cosmology, but a basis in individual faith and spirituality.

Muslims
Abdul Baba was a close devotee of Sai Baba and was the caretaker of the shrine from 1918 to 1922. A large number of Muslim devotees used to come to the shrine until the 1980s.

Parsis

Saibaba was revered by prominent Zoroastrians such as Nanabhoy Palkhivala, Farhaad Panthaky and Homi Bhabha, and has been cited as the Zoroastrians' most popular non-Zoroastrian religious figure.

Meher Baba, who was born into a Zoroastrian family, met Sai Baba in December 1915. This event is considered as the most significant in Meher Baba's life. Shri Sai Satcharita (Sai Baba's life story), makes no mention of Meher Baba, but in Lord Meher, the life story of Meher Baba, there are numerous references to Sai Baba.

Meher Baba credited his own Avataric advent to Upasani, Sai Baba, and three other Perfect Masters: Hazrat Babajan, Hazrat Tajuddin Baba, and Narayan Maharaj. He declared Sai Baba to be a Qutub-e-Irshad (the highest of the five Qutubs, a "Master of the Universe" in the spiritual hierarchy). This classification of avatar and satgurus and the associated name is applied within the Meher Baba community alone.

In culture

Sacred art and architecture

There are many temples of Shirdi Sai Baba in India. Temples are also located in countries outside India, including the United States, Trinidad and Tobago, Guyana, Suriname, Fiji, Mauritius, South Africa, Netherlands, Kenya, Benin, Cuba, Canada, Pakistan, Australia, United Kingdom, Germany, Japan and New Zealand. In the mosque in Shirdi where Sai Baba lived, there is a life-size portrait of him by Shama Rao Jaykar, an artist from Mumbai. There are numerous monuments and statues, designed to serve a religious function, of Sai Baba of Shirdi. One of these, made of marble by a sculptor named Balaji Vasant Talim, is in the Samadhi Mandir in Shirdi where Sai Baba was buried.

In 2008, India Post issued a commemorative postage stamp of ₹5.00 to honour Shirdi Sai Baba.

Film and television
Sai Baba has been the subject of feature films in various languages produced by the Indian film industry.

See also
 List of Hindu gurus and saints
 Shirdi Sai Baba movement

References

Bibliography

 Arulneyam, Durai, The Gospel of Shri Shirdi Sai Baba. A Holy Spiritual Path, New Delhi, Sterling, 2008. 
  Babuji, Sri Sainathuni Sarath, 'Arati Sai Baba, The Psalm Book of Shirdi Aratis, Saipatham Publications, 1996 available online
 Kamath, M. V. & Kher, V. B., Sai Baba of Shirdi: A Unique Saint, India: Jaico Publishing House (1997). 
 Osborne, Arthur, The Incredible Sai Baba. The Life and Miracles of a Modern-day Saint, Hyderabad, Orient Longman, 1957. 
 Panday, Balkrishna, Sai Baba's 261 Leelas. A Treasure House of Miracles, New Delhi, Sterling, 2004. 
 Parthasarathy, Rangaswami, God Who Walked on Earth. The Life and Times of Shirdi Sai Baba, New Delhi, Sterling, 1996. .
 Rao, Sham P. P., Five Contemporary Gurus in the Shirdi (Sai Baba) Tradition, Bangalore: Christian Institute for the Study of Religion and Society, 1972. .
 Venkataraman, Krishnaswamy, Shirdi Stories, Srishti Publishers, New Delhi, 2002. 
 White, Charles S. J., The Sai Baba Movement: Approaches to the Study of India Saints in Journal of Asian Studies, Vol. 31, No. 4 (Aug. 1972), pp. 863–878
 White Charles S. J., The Sai Baba Movement: Study of a Unique Contemporary Moral and Spiritual Movement, New Delhi, Arnold-Heinemann, 1985.
 Williams, Alison, Experiencing Sai Baba's Shirdi. A Guide, revised edition, Shirdi, Saipatham Publications. 2004  available online
 Walshe-Ryan, Lorraine, I am always with you'', Reprint 2008, New Delhi, Sterling Publishing, 2006. .
 Guruji Vij Rajesh, Service to Living beings is service to god Jai Sai Naam (1995) India

External links

 
 
 Shri Saibaba Sansthan Trust, Shirdi
 Shirdi Home Page
 Shirdi Sai Baba, The Practical Guru – Sri Nannagaru
 The Sai Baba of Shirdi (c 1838 – 1918)

 
Year of birth unknown
1918 deaths
19th-century Hindu religious leaders
Ascetics
Consequentialists
Hindu mystics
Hindu revivalists
Indian Hindu monks
Indian Hindu saints
Indian Hindu spiritual teachers
Indian Sufi saints
Islam and other religions
People considered avatars by their followers
Religious pluralism
People from Ahmednagar
People from Maharashtra
People from Marathwada